Per Svedberg (born 1965) is a Swedish social democratic politician, member of the Riksdag since the 2006 Swedish general election. He is  living in the village of Norrbo in Gävleborg County with his partner Monica and their children. He enjoys rallying and "julefest".

References

External links
 Riksdagen: Per Svedberg (s)
 Socialdemokraterna (Per Svedberg)
 Swedish MP Per Svedberg caught with his trousers down

People from Hälsingland
1965 births
Living people
Members of the Riksdag from the Social Democrats